Michael Metzger is an American freestyle motocross (FMX) rider.

Life and career
In the 2002 X Games, Metzger won the Freestyle and Big Air events and got second place in Step Up, earning him an estimated $100,000 in three days. In 2003 he also got first place in Big Air at Winter X. On May 4, 2006, at 9:26, Metzger completed "The Impossible Jump", doing a world record backflip over the fountains in front of Caesars Palace, Las Vegas, seen live on ESPN. He is the first person to complete a backflip over the fountains, and only the second person to ever successfully land that jump. The others to attempt the jump over Caesars Palace's fountains include Evel Knievel, Gary Wells, and Robbie Knievel, of which only Robbie landed successfully. Not only did Metzger complete this jump whilst performing a backflip, but he also set the record for distance, landing 125 feet from the takeoff ramp. Metzger recently has been doing freeride. 

Commonly known as "The Godfather of Freestyle Motocross", Metzger was one of the first riders to begin doing basic tricks such as heel clickers and can cans. His acrobatic accomplishments include being the first person to complete back-to-back-flips (two flips on two consecutive jumps) at the X Games.  As a result of his popularity, he also appeared in Freekstyle, a 2002 motocross racing video game for the PlayStation 2, Game Boy Advance and Nintendo GameCube, and his image is on the cover of the game's box.  He invented the heel clicker (Frezno Smooth).

Metzger has appeared numerous times on the Discovery Channel's extreme sport show Stunt Junkies. In the last episode he appeared in, he was seriously injured; while attempting to execute a jump with a back-flip between two barges, he overshot the landing ramp and suffered a compression fracture of the L4 vertebra in his lower back.

He also invented the "McMetz", a trick in which the rider puts both feet over the handlebars in midair, then sweeps them backward towards his arms, takes his hands off the bars to allow the legs by, then remounts the bike after floating detached from it for a split second.

Metzger lives in Big Bear, California.

Personal life
Metzger is the son of Ted Fritz and Sharon Metzger, and grandson of Fritz Metzger. Metzger is married to Mandi Rose and they have two children.

References

External links 
Mike Metzger Official page on FMX Life
Mike Metzger's Motocross Team: The Mob Syndicate
EXPN Web Chat with Mike after the 2002 X-Games
Metzger's profile on GrindTV.com

American motorcycle racers
Motorcycle builders
Freestyle motocross riders
Living people
People from Menifee, California
World record setters in motorcycling
1975 births